is a Japanese actress, voice actress and narrator from Kanagawa Prefecture.

She played Urara Kasugano/Cure Lemonade in Yes! PreCure 5 and its sequel GoGo!, Killua Zoldyck in Hunter × Hunter (2011), Ray in The Promised Neverland, Midari Ikishima in Kakegurui – Compulsive Gambler, Reg in Made in Abyss, Eureka (Bonnie in the English dub) in Pokémon XY and Levy McGarden in Fairy Tail.

Biography
Ise became interested in acting after watching Princess Mononoke in third grade. Initially, she longed for director work and began to see various works.

In 2002, she starred in the anime series Aishiteruze Baby. Immediately after her debut, she voiced Cure Lemonade in Yes! PreCure 5 and the guest star of television special Lupin III: Seven Days Rhapsody. Ise is known for being a prolific voice actor who's played a wide variety of roles.

On October 1, 2009, she moved her office from Bring-up to Across Entertainment. She married in January 2015. In the fall of that year, she reported on her blog that she gave birth to her first child. She divorced in August 2022 and took full custody of her child.

Filmography

Television animation

OVAs/ONAs

Theatrical animation

Drama CDs 
Attack on Titan (xxx) – Isabel Magnolia
Uwasa no Midori-kun!! (xxxx) – Midori Yamate
Tonari no Kaibutsu-kun (xxxx) – Mizutani Shizuku
Atelier Ayesha: The Alchemist of Dusk (xxxx) – Nio Altugle (anime adaptation)
Vampire Knight Memories (2019) – Ai Kuran

Video games 
Shin Megami Tensei: Devil Survivor Overclocked (2011) – Midori Komaki
Final Fantasy XIII-2 (2011) – Paddra Nsu-Yeul
Phantasy Star Online 2 (2012) – Ulc, Euclita
Tales of Xillia 2 (2012) – Elle Mel Marta
Dragon's Dogma: Dark Arisen (2013) – Aelinore
Conception II: Children of the Seven Stars (2013) – Ellie Troit
The Witch and the Hundred Knight (2013) – Metallia
Atelier Ayesha: The Alchemist of Dusk (2013) – Nio Altugle
Final Fantasy XIV: A Realm Reborn (2013) – Nanamo Ul Namo, Tataru
The Legend of Heroes: Trails of Cold Steel (2013) - Laura S. Arseid
Lightning Returns: Final Fantasy XIII (2013) – Paddra Nsu-Yeul
Granblue Fantasy (2014) – Farrah, Helel ben Shalem
Schoolgirl Strikers (2014) - Amane Kyobashi
J-Stars Victory VS (2014) - Killua Zoldyck
Atelier Escha & Logy: Alchemists of the Dusk Sky (2014) – Nio Altugle
Danganronpa Another Episode: Ultra Despair Girls (2014) - Nagisa Shingetsu
The Legend of Heroes: Trails of Cold Steel II (2014) - Laura S. Arseid
Xenoblade Chronicles X (2015) – Lin
The Legend of Heroes: Trails of Cold Steel III (2018) – Laura S. Arseid
Azur Lane (2018) - USS Radford (DD-446), USS Jenkins (DD-447)
Fate/Grand Order (2018) - Hinako Akuta - Consort Yu ("Yu Meiren" in English version; "Gu Bijin" in Japanese version)
Food Fantasy (2018) – Yogurt, Macaron, Nasi Lemak
The Legend of Heroes: Trails of Cold Steel IV (2018) – Laura S. Arseid
Tokyo Afterschool Summoners (2018) - Arc, Durga
Another Eden (2019) - Nagi
The Seven Deadly Sins: Grand Cross (2019) - Guila
Arknights (2019) - Magallan
Final Fantasy XIV: Shadowbringers (2019) – Beq Lugg
Grimms Notes (2020) - Lafcadio
Girls' Frontline (2020) - QBU-88, ACR
Live-A-Hero (2020) - Sui
Magia Record (2020) - Rui Mizuki
Shin Megami Tensei Nocturne HD Remaster (2020) - Lucifer (Blonde Child form)
Lord of Heroes (2020) - Astrid Remond
Dragon Quest Rivals Ace (2021) - Tipper Taloon
The Caligula Effect 2 (2021) – Kudan
Sin Chronicle (2021) – Biscuit
Cookie Run: Kingdom (2021) – Tiger Lily Cookie, Sherbet Cookie
Made in Abyss: Binary Star Falling into Darkness as Reg
Counter:Side (2022) - Evolve One
JoJo's Bizarre Adventure: All Star Battle R – Foo Fighters

Unknown date
Age of Ishtaria – Salix
Kantai Collection – I-401
Super Heroine Chronicle (2014) – Riko Mine Lupin the 4th
Tales of Xillia 2 – Elle Mel Marta
Zettai Meikyuu Grimm – Henrietta Grimm
Zettai Zetsubō Shōjo: Danganronpa AnotherEpisode – Nagisa Shingetsu

Dubbing

Live-action
A Discovery of Witches – Satu Järvinen (Malin Buska)
And Just Like That... – Rose Goldenblatt (Alexa Swinton)
Emma's Chance – Emma (Greer Grammer)
The Exorcist – Casey Rance (Hannah Kasulka)
Mad Max: Fury Road (2019 THE CINEMA edition) – Capable (Riley Keough)
Moonfall – Michelle (Kelly Yu)
Smash – Margot (Nikki Blonsky)
Station Eleven – Young Kirsten (Matilda Lawler)
The Queen's Gambit - Beth Harmon (Anya Taylor-Joy)
The Three Musketeers – Princess Anne (Juno Temple)
The Witches – Daisy (Kristin Chenoweth)

Animation
Winx Club (animated TV series (Japanese)) (2005-2007) – Musa (debuted in Japan in 2007)
Higglytown Heroes (Playhouse Disney) (animated TV series (Japanese)) - Fran (Season 2, debuted in Japan in 2005)
Chuggington (CBeebies/Disney Junior) (animated TV series (Japanese)) – Emery (debuted in Japan in 2011)
The Addams Family – Parker Needler
Adventure Time: Distant Lands – Cadebra

Substitutes
Chinami Hashimoto – Minna Atsumare! Falcom Gakuen – Laura S. Arzaid
Mika Kanai – Pokemon XY – Bonnie
Ikumi Hayama – Fairy Tail – Levy McGarden

References

External links 
 

1984 births
Living people
Across Entertainment voice actors
Japanese stage actresses
Japanese video game actresses
Japanese voice actresses
Voice actresses from Kanagawa Prefecture
21st-century Japanese actresses